Damned is a British television sitcom shown on Channel 4. It is set in the office of the children's services department of fictional Elm Heath Council.

Production
In March 2014, Sky Arts announced that it was reprising its Playhouse Presents series of self-contained television plays. Jo Brand and Morwenna Banks penned a script for what was hoped to be a pilot episode. Sky Arts aired the episode but never commissioned it to series; so Brand, Banks, and comedic writer Will Smith re-developed it for Channel 4, who announced its commission in May 2016.

Broadcast
The first series premiered on Channel 4 on 27 September 2016, and concluded on 1 November 2016. In February 2017, Channel 4 commissioned a second six-episode series. Series 2 began broadcasting on 14 February 2018. Episode 5 of the second series was not aired as planned on 14 March 2018 to make space for a tribute to Professor Stephen Hawking, who had died a day earlier. The episode was then aired a week later on 21 March 2018 as a double feature alongside the sixth and final episode of the second series.

Cast and characters 
 Rose Denby (Jo Brand) – Series 1–2 – Senior Social Worker 
 Alastair (Al) Kavanagh (Alan Davies) – Series 1–2 – Senior Social Worker 
 Martin Bickerstaff (Kevin Eldon) – Series 1–2 – Senior Social Worker then Team Leader, former banker, on medical leave throughout series 1.
 Denise (Georgie Glen) – Series 1–2 – Cluster Manager. 
  Nitin (Himesh Patel) – Series 1–2 – Social Worker, former Metropolitan Police Service constable. 
 Natalie (Nat) (Isy Suttie) – Series 1–2 – Executive Assistant from a temp agency. 
 Ingrid (Morwenna Banks) – Series 1–2 – Senior Social Worker, foster carer, on medical leave throughout series 1.
 Mimi (Lolly Adefope) – 2 – Student Social Worker on placement.
 Cass (Sara Powell) – Series 1–2 – Psychologist.

Episodes
 #partially completed 26/02/18 w/ref to http://www.channel4.com/info/press/programme-information/damned-series-2

Pilot (2014)

Series 1 (2016)

Series 2 (2018)

References

External links 

Damned at Channel 4
Damned at British Comedy Guide

2014 British television series debuts
2018 British television series endings
2010s British comedy-drama television series
2010s British sitcoms
2010s British workplace comedy television series
Channel 4 comedy dramas
Channel 4 sitcoms
English-language television shows